Ravenswood Park is a nature reserve in the western section of Gloucester, Massachusetts owned and managed by the Trustees of Reservations, which acquired the property in 1993. It can be accessed from Western Avenue, the road to Manchester through the Magnolia area. Ravenswood Park is frequented by cross-country skiers during the winter.

References

External links
 The Trustees of Reservations: Ravenswood Park
 Trail map
 Essex National Heritage Commission: Ravenswood Park

Gloucester, Massachusetts
The Trustees of Reservations
Landmarks in Massachusetts
Open space reserves of Massachusetts
Parks in Essex County, Massachusetts
Protected areas established in 1993
1993 establishments in Massachusetts